Para swimming is an adaptation of the sport of swimming for athletes with disabilities. Para swimmers compete at the Summer Paralympic Games and at other sports competitions throughout the world. The sport is governed by the International Paralympic Committee. Both men and women compete in para swimming, racing against competitors of their own gender. Swimming has been a part of the Paralympic program since the 1960 Summer Olympics in Rome, Italy.

Rules 

Rules for the sport are adapted from those set forth by the International Swimming Federation (FINA). Swimmers compete individually in backstroke, breaststroke, butterfly, freestyle, individual medley, and as teams in relay races. At the Paralympics, World Championships and other elite level competitions, swimmers compete in an Olympic-size swimming pool.

Significant differences between able-bodied and para swimming include the starting position and adaptations allowed for visually impaired swimmers. Competitors may start a race by standing on a platform and diving into the pool, as in non-disabled swimming, or by sitting on the platform and diving in, or they may start the race in the water. In events for the blind and visually impaired, people called "tappers" may stand at the end of the pool and use a pole to tap the swimmers when they approach the wall, indicating when the swimmer should turn or end the race. No prostheses or assistive devices may be worn during competition.

Classification 

Swimmers are classified according to the type and extent of their disability. The classification system allows swimmers to compete against others with a similar level of function.

Swimmers with physical disabilities are allocated a category between 1 and 10, with 1 corresponding to the most severe types of disability. Physical disabilities of para swimmers include single or multiple limb loss (through birth defects and/or amputation), cerebral palsy, spinal cord injuries (leading to paralysis or disability in limb coordination), dwarfism, and disabilities which impair the use of joints.

Blind and visually impaired swimmers compete within separate categories, being allocated to categories 11, 12 or 13. Category 11 corresponds to totally blind swimmers, while competitors in category 12 have severe but not total visual impairment. Category 11 swimmers compete with blackened goggles to ensure competitors are on an even level. Category 11 swimmers are also required to use tappers but they are optional for categories 12 and 13.

Swimmers with mental disabilities compete in category 14, while deaf and hearing impaired swimmers compete in category 15.

Numbers are combined with a letter prefix depending on the event type. An "S" prefix corresponds to freestyle, backstroke and butterfly, while "SB" corresponds to breaststroke and "SM" to the medley. Hence, a swimmer with severe physical disabilities competing in backstroke may compete in an S3 event, while a blind swimmer in the medley would compete in class SM11.

For relay races, athletes from different classifications compete together, but the sum of their individual classifications must not exceed a given points total. For example, a relay team for a 34 points freestyle relay may consist of two S8 swimmers and two S9 swimmers (9 + 9 + 8 + 8 = 34), or an S10 swimmer and three S8 swimmers (10 + 8 + 8 + 8 = 34)

Events
Swimming at the Summer Paralympics

World Para Swimming Championships

World Para Swimming European Championships

Para Swimming World Series - Since 2017.

Para Swimming World Series

Source:

https://www.paralympic.org/swimming/about

The World Series was launched in 2017.

https://www.paralympic.org/swimming/world-series-2017 - 5 Meetings
https://www.paralympic.org/swimming/world-series-2018 - 6 Meetings
https://www.paralympic.org/swimming/world-series-2019 - 7 Meetings
https://www.paralympic.org/swimming/world-series-2020 - 7 Meetings (5 of 7 was cancelled)
https://www.paralympic.org/swimming/world-series-2021 - 4 Meetings
https://www.paralympic.org/swimming/world-series-2022 - 6 Meetings
https://www.paralympic.org/swimming/world-series-2023 - 8 Meetings

2017
Source:

2017 World Para Swimming World Series 

City, country 	Name 	Date

Copenhagen, Denmark 	Copenhagen 2017 World Para Swimming World Series 	11-12 March
São Paulo, Brazil 	São Paulo 2017 World Para Swimming World Series - Loterias Caixa Swimming Open Championships 	21-23 April
Sheffield, Great Britain 	Sheffield 2017 World Para Swimming World Series - British Para Swimming International Meet 	27-30 April
Indianapolis, USA 	Indianapolis 2017 World Para Swimming World Series 	9-11 June
Berlin, Germany 	Berlin 2017 World Para Swimming World Series - Internationale Deutsche Meisterschaften Swimming Berlin 	6-9 July

2018
Source:

2018 World Para Swimming World Series 

City, country 	Name 	Date

Copenhagen, Denmark 	2018 World Para Swimming World Series 	2-4 March
Indianapolis, USA 	2018 World Para Swimming World Series 	19-21 April
São Paulo, Brazil 	2018 World Para Swimming World Series Loterias Caixa Swimming Open Championships 	26-28 April
Lignano Sabbiadoro, Italy 	2018 World Para Swimming World Series 	24-27 May
Sheffield, Great Britain 	2018 World Para Swimming World Series British Para Swimming International Meet 	31 May-3 June
Berlin, Germany 	2018 World Para Swimming World Series Internationale Deutsche Meisterschaften Swimming Berlin 	7-10 June

2019
Source:

2019 World Para Swimming World Series 

City, country 	Name 	Date

Melbourne, Australia – 15-17 February 2019
Indianapolis, USA – 4-6 April 2019
São Paulo, Brazil – 26-28 April 2019
Glasgow, Great Britain – 25-28 April 2019
Singapore – 10-12 May 2019
Lignano Sabbiadoro, Italy – 30 May-2 June 2019
Berlin, Germany – 6-9 June 2019

2020
Source:

2020 World Para Swimming World Series 

City, country 	Name 	Date

Melbourne, Australia 14-16 February 2020
Lignano Sabbiadoro, Italy 27 February -1 March 2020 (CANCELLED)
São Paulo, Brazil 25 -28 March 2020 (CANCELLED)
Sheffield, Great Britain 9-12 April 2020 (CANCELLED)
Indianapolis, USA 16-18 April 2020 (CANCELLED)
Singapore, 1-3 May 2020 (CANCELLED)
Berlin, Germany 2020 15-18 October 2020 (new dates)

2021
Source:

2021 World Para Swimming World Series 

City, country 	Name 	Date

Sheffield 2021 World Series, Great Britain; 8 – 11 April
Lewisville 2021 World Series, USA; 15 - 17 April
Lignano Sabbiadoro 2021 World Series, Italy; 17 - 18 April
Berlin 2021 World Series, Germany; 17 – 20 June

2022
Source:

2022 World Para Swimming World Series 

City, country 	Name 	Date

Para Swimming World Series Great Britain 17–20 February Aberdeen
Para Swimming World Series Australia 18-20 February Melbourne 
Para Swimming World Series Italy 11-13 March Lignano Sabbiadoro
Para Swimming World Series Germany 31 March-3 April Berlin 
Para Swimming World Series USA 7-9 April Indianapolis

2023
Source:

Citi Para Swimming World Series Australia 17-19 February
Citi Para Swimming World Series Lignano Sabbiadoro 9-12 March
Citi Para Swimming World Series Great Britain 16–19 March
Citi Para Swimming World Series USA 20-22 April
Citi Para Swimming World Series Singapore 29 April-1 May
Citi Para Swimming World Series Berlin 11-14 May
Citi Para Swimming World Series France 26-28 Ma
Citi Para Swimming World Series Mexico 5-8 October

Notable para swimmers 
 Daniel Dias
 Jessica Long
 Ellie Simmonds
 Trischa Zorn
 Brad Snyder
 Zheng Tao

See also

World Disabled Swimmers of the Year''' 
:Category:World record holders in paralympic swimming
Disability sport classification
Swimming at the Summer Paralympics

References

External links
World Para Swimming

 
Swimming
Swimming